Denzil Reginald D'Souza (2 July 1929 – 25 October 2002) was an Indian clergyman and bishop for the Catholic Diocese of Aizawl. D'Souza was born in Kolkata. He became ordained in 1955. He was appointed bishop in 1969. He died on 25 October 2002, at the age of 73.

References

1929 births
2002 deaths
People from Kolkata
20th-century Roman Catholic bishops in India
21st-century Roman Catholic bishops in India